Tinker Bell is fictional character in the form of a fairy.

Tinker Bell may also refer to:

Tinker Bell (film), a 2008 CGI computer-animated film about the main character
Tinker Bell (film series), a computer animated film series produced by DisneyToon Studios
Disney Fairies: Tinker Bell, a video game loosely based on the first computer-animated film

See also
Tinkerbell effect
Tinkerbell map, a discrete-time dynamical system
Tinkerbelle, a sailboat
Tinkerbelle the Dog, canine model
Tinkebell (born 1979), Dutch artist
Tink (disambiguation)